New Philadelphia is an unincorporated community in Franklin Township, Washington County, in the U.S. state of Indiana.

History
New Philadelphia was originally called Philadelphia, and under the latter name was laid out in 1837.

A post office was established at New Philadelphia in 1833, and remained in operation until it was discontinued in 1938.

Geography

Notable people
John M. Bloss 1860, third President of Oregon State University, was born in New Philadelphia.

References

Unincorporated communities in Washington County, Indiana
1837 establishments in Indiana
Unincorporated communities in Indiana
Populated places established in 1837